Mompha circumscriptella, the circumscript mompha moth, is a moth in the family Momphidae. It is found in North America, where it has been recorded from Alabama, Arkansas, British Columbia, California, Florida, Georgia, Illinois, Indiana, Iowa, Kansas, Kentucky, Louisiana, Maine, Maryland, Mississippi, Missouri, Nebraska, New Jersey, North Carolina, Ohio, Oklahoma, South Carolina, Tennessee, Texas and West Virginia.

Adults are narrow-winged with a distinctive forewing color pattern.

The larvae feed on Oenothera species. They bore into the fruit of the host plant. Pupation takes place inside the fruit.

References

Moths described in 1873
Momphidae
Moths of North America